The 2000–01 Coppa Italia was the 54th edition of the tournament. The tournament was won by Fiorentina, for their 6th title, also qualifying for the UEFA Cup in the progress. It was Fiorentina's second title in recent years, having also won the 1995–96 edition of the tournament.  Fiorentina defeated Parma in the two-legged final on an aggregate score of 2–1.

Seedings and format
In the 2000–01 Coppa Italia featured 48 teams competing: all 18 clubs from Serie A, all 20 clubs from Serie B, the 4 clubs relegated from Serie B in 1999-00 season, the 4 playoff runners-up from 1999-00 Serie C1 season and the 2 finalists of the 1999/00 Serie C Coppa Italia competition. 

The format for pairings were:
 Group Stage: one-leg fixtures
 First round: The 32 non-seeded clubs were divided into 8 groups of 4 teams each.  Each team played the other three from its group once and the top team from each group advanced to the second round.
Points were awarded as 3 points for a win, 1 point for a draw, and 0 points for loss.  In the event of a tie at the conclusion of this stage, the group goes to the team with the best goal difference in the match, otherwise the best overall goal difference.
 Knockout Rounds: two-leg fixtures
 Second round:  Clubs 9–14 from Serie A and the top two clubs from Serie B were paired against the 8 advancing teams from the group stage.
 Round of 16: Teams 1–8 from Serie A were paired against the 8 winners of the second round
 Quarterfinals, Semifinals and Finals: Two-leg fixtures with pairings based upon bracket

Group 1

Group 2

Group 3

Group 4

Group 5

Group 6

Group 7

Group 8

Knockout stage

Final

First leg

Second leg

Fiorentina won 2–1 on aggregate.

Top goalscorers

References
rsssf.com

Coppa Italia seasons
Italy
Coppa Italia